Pinara cana, the neat pinara, is a species of moth of the family Lasiocampidae first described by Francis Walker in 1855. It is found in the south-east quarter of Australia.

The wingspan is about 40 mm for males and 60 mm for females.

The larvae feed on eucalyptus species.

References

Lasiocampidae
Moths of Australia
Moths described in 1855